Suhail Ahmad Bhat (born 8 April 2005) is an Indian footballer currently playing as a forward for ATK Mohun Bagan.

Club career
In 2017, Bhat was selected from a football camp in Srinagar to join the Sports Council Football Academy.

In September 2022, he was named by English newspaper The Guardian as one of the best players born in 2005 worldwide.

Following the disbanding of the Indian Arrows, he was left without a club. However, on 1 January 2023, he joined ATK Mohun Bagan.

International career
Bhat was first called up for the India national under-16 football team in 2021, scoring on his debut against the United Arab Emirates.

Career statistics

Club

References

2005 births
Living people
Indian footballers
India youth international footballers
Association football forwards
I-League players
Indian Arrows players
ATK Mohun Bagan FC players